Ukkusissaq or Ukkusissat (old spelling: Uvkusigssak´ or Uvkusigssat) is a  tall mountain in the Sermersooq municipality in southwestern Greenland, located to the southeast of Nuuk Airport, an airport in Nuuk, the capital of Greenland. It is the terminus of a long mountain range of a peninsula jutting into Nuup Kangerlua, the longest fjord in southwestern Greenland, to the north of Kangerluarsunnguaq Fjord splitting the peninsula into two.

References 

Mountains of Greenland
Geography of Nuuk